Qi Yuwu (born 28 November 1976) is a Chinese actor based in Singapore. He is a permanent resident of Singapore and a contracted artiste under Beijing Enlight Media Group.

Early life and career 
Qi studied at Guangzhou Physical Education Institute before moving to Singapore. He won the title of Champion and Mr Personality in the China Round of Star Search Singapore in 1999. Previously, Qi worked as a model and played the lead role in a Guangzhou-produced television series, before signing on a contract with the Television Corporation of Singapore (now Mediacorp).

In 2000, Qi was cast in his debut role as Sikong Zhaixing in Master Swordsman Lu Xiaofeng with other actors from Singapore and the Asian-Pacific region. Following that, Qi was cast in Dare To Strike, another Singapore-Hong Kong co-produced television series.

Apart from acting in Singaporean television dramas, Qi has also starred in international films, some of which were produced by Mediacorp Raintree Pictures. He also starred 2011 in the Australian 3-D Horror film Bait 3D.

In January 2013, Qi worked with renowned Chinese artist, Feng Zhengjie, to present their artwork, 'Showcase on Print' for the inaugural Worlds Apart Fair.

At Star Awards 2016 Yuwu received his All-Time Favourite Artiste award and also won his second Best Actor award for his role as Jason Lam in The Dream Makers II.

Personal life 
In April 2013, Qi began dating co-star Joanne Peh. On 9 September 2014, the couple got married at The Mövenpick Heritage Hotel Sentosa.

On 28 January 2015, the couple announced that they were expecting their first child. On 7 August 2015, Qi and Peh welcomed a baby girl at Mount Elizabeth Hospital.

In October 2016, Qi and Peh announced that they were expecting a second child, and on 21 April 2017 Peh gave birth to a boy.

Filmography

Film

Television

Awards and nominations

References

External links

Qi Yuwu's blog
Profile on xinmsn

Living people
1976 births
Male actors from Guangdong
Male actors from Guangzhou
Cantonese people
Singaporean male television actors
Singaporean male film actors